Milo Urban (pseudonyms Ján Rovňan ml., Podbabjagurský) (24 August 1904 – 10 March 1982) was Slovak writer, translator, journalist and important representatives of modern Slovak literature. Urban is controversial figure because he served as an editor-in-chief of an official propagandist magazine of the Hlinka Guard Gardista in the era of the clerofascist Slovak State and was found guilty for collaboration by the court in 1948.

Works

Stories, novellas, novels
 1920 - Ej, ten tanec, story (published in magazine Vatra)
 Nešťastník
 Už je pozde
 V zhone žitia
 Vanitas vanitatum
 Typograf
 1922 - Jašek Kutliak spod Bačinky (Jašek Kutliak from Under Bučinka), novella
 1926 - Za vyšným mlynom (Beyond the Upper Mill), this work was used as a model to Eugen Suchoň's opera Krútňava
 1928 - Výkriky bez ozveny (Calls Without Echo), collection of novellas
 V súmraku
 Štefan Koňarčík-Chrapek a Pán Boh
 Rozprávka o Labudovi
 Mičinova kobyla
 Tajomstvo Pavla Hrona
 Svedomie a Staroba
 1932 - Z tichého frontu (From the Silent Front), collection of novellas
 Skok do priepasti
 Nie! 
 Roztopené srdce
 Pred dražbou
 Drevený chlieb
 Človek, ktorý hľadá šťastie
 1927 - Živý bič (The Living Whip), novel (1st part of the trilogy)
 1930 - Hmly na úsvite (Fog at Dawn), free continuation of Živý bič (2nd part of the pentalogy)
 1940 - V osídlach (In the Snares), free continuation of Živý bič (3rd part of the pentalogy)
 1943 - Novely (Novellas)
 1957 - Zhasnuté svetlá (Lights Doused), free continuation of Živý bič (4th part of the pentalogy)
 1964 - Kto seje vietor (Who Sows the Wind), free continuation of Živý bič (5th part of the pentalogy)
 1996 - Železom po železe

Essays
 1970 - Zelená krv: Spomienky hájnikovho syna (Green Blood: Memories of the gamekeeper's son)
 1992 - Kade-tade po Halinde
 1994 - Na brehu krvavej rieky
 1995 - Sloboda nie je špás

Other works
 1920 / 1921 - Zavrhnutý, poem (published in magazine Vatra)
 1925 - Otroci predsudkov, play (only preview, which was published in magazine Slovenský národ)
 1934 - Česká literatúra a Slováci, lecture
 1991 - Beta, kde si? , play (only year of inscenation, not published)

Translations
 1951 - selection from Russian tales
 1954 - Igor Newerly: Pamiątka z Celulozy
 1959 - Aleksander Fredro: Pan Geldhab (Mr. Geldhab)
 1960 - Karel Čapek and Josef Čapek: Zo života hmyzu (Pictures from the Insects' Life)
 1961 - Karel Čapek: Matka (The Mother)

External links
 Biography

1904 births
1982 deaths
Slovak journalists
Slovak translators
Slovak writers
20th-century translators
People from Námestovo District
20th-century journalists